The Casco Bay Bridge is a bascule bridge that spans the Fore River, connecting South Portland and Portland, Maine, United States. The bridge carries four lanes (two in each direction) of State Route 77, a bike lane in each direction, and a pedestrian sidewalk on the east side of the span.

History
In 1987 the state of Maine, in concert with surrounding towns, concluded that the existing Million Dollar Bridge, which was almost 70 years old, was inadequate for current needs. This bridge, also a draw bridge, had only two traffic lanes and offered severely limited clearances for maritime traffic. Given increases in tanker commerce and increased usage of the bridge, a replacement was decided on, and construction started in 1993. The Casco Bay Bridge was completed in 1997.

In October 2015, the Maine Department of Transportation announced that it was seeking bids to privatize the maintenance and operation of the bridge, stating that it would be more cost effective and efficient for taxpayers.  If done, it would be the first time the State privatized the operation of a bridge.  The Maine State Employees Association questioned the public safety implications of a private entity operating the bridge, as wondered what would happen to the employees who presently operate it.

Design

The new Casco Bay Bridge has four 12 foot (3.7 m) wide lanes, with a pedestrian lane on its eastern side. The bridge is supported by several 7 foot (2.1m meter) thick concrete H-pile cylinders, which the bridge's steel girders sit atop. The new bridge has much higher horizontal and vertical clearances, which allow larger ships access further into the Fore River, with the bascule also having to open less frequently. Extra precautions were taken to ensure that the bridge had sufficient pier protection (during construction to the bridge, the existing Million Dollar Bridge was struck at its piers by the oil tanker Julie N., which spilled roughly 179,600 gallons (679,860 liters) of heating oil into Casco Bay. The bridge's steelwork was painted red in order to make it aesthetically pleasing.

The final cost for the Casco Bay Bridge was $130 million, making it the largest project undertaken by the Maine Department of Transportation at the time.

SMS text alert system
According to the Bangor Daily News, a South Portland entrepreneur started a unique service for Casco Bay Bridge commuters in October 2012. The service, titled cascobaybridge.com, offers subscribers a text message alert when the Casco Bay Bridge goes up due to passing ships. Currently the service is offered during the morning and evening rush hours, but may be expanded if demand warrants.

References

Bascule bridges in the United States
Bridges completed in 1997
Buildings and structures in South Portland, Maine
Bridges in Portland, Maine
Road bridges in Maine
Steel bridges in the United States
Girder bridges in the United States
1997 establishments in Maine